Roxbury Correctional Institution is a medium security prison operated by the Maryland Department of Public Safety and Correctional Services in Hagerstown, Maryland.

Prisoners
In 2014, twenty-five war veterans at Roxbury took part in the nationally recognized POW/MIA recognition day.

In 2015, Darryl Strawberry gave a motivational speech to inmates at Roxbury. Inmates at Roxbury take care of animals through a program that also benefits the inmates.

Notable incidents
While a Roxbury guard, Jeffrey Wroten, was guarding an inmate at a local hospital, the inmate shot and killed Wroten.

Two former guards were sentenced to prison in federal court for assaulting an inmate.

References

Buildings and structures in Hagerstown, Maryland
Prisons in Maryland
Government buildings in Maryland
Government buildings completed in 1983
1983 establishments in Maryland